Melton Airfield  is a small grass strip airfield located approximately  north of the city centre of Melton in the City of Melton, Victoria, Australia.

It is located at the intersection of Coburns Road and Diggers Rest - Coimadai Road. The small grass airstrip runs approximately east–west. The airfield is home to the Melton Air Services. It has four hangars and parking for light aircraft, an office and vehicle parking.

The airfield was established by Terry Fogarty Sr and known in the early days as "Fogarty's Field". Terry Fogarty Jr. served as a flying instructor there for many years.

See also
 List of airports in Victoria

References

External links
 Airport Guide

Airports in Victoria (Australia)
Airports established in 1969